Erjona Emërllahu (born 20 July 2001) is a Kosovan footballer who plays as a midfielder for Women's League club KFF A&N and the Kosovo women's national team.

See also
List of Kosovo women's international footballers

References

2001 births
Living people
Kosovan women's footballers
Women's association football midfielders
Kosovo women's international footballers